"Raining Tacos" is a song by American musician Parry Gripp. It was released onto streaming services on June 29, 2012. It subsequently appeared on his greatest hits album Parry Gripp Mega-Party (2013).

History 
This is considered one of his most notable songs. It was adapted into a mobile game in 2014.

It was eventually adapted into a book by Harper Collins in June of 2021. It was also featured on This Might be a Podcast. The song, along with Baby Shark were both used by the West Palm Beach authorities to drive away homeless people from the streets by playing the songs non-stop, and out loud in the streets.

A Christmas rendition of the song titled "Raining Tacos (On Christmas Eve)" was released on Gripp's album Jingle Burgers – A Parry Gripp Christmas Album (2020).

References 

2013 songs
Novelty songs
Parry Gripp songs
Children's songs